This list of nearest bright stars is a table of stars found within 15 parsecs (48.9 light-years) of the nearest star, the Sun, that have an absolute magnitude of +8.5 or brighter, which is approximately comparable to a listing of stars more luminous than a red dwarf. Right ascension and declination coordinates are for the epoch J2000. The distance measurements are based on the Hipparcos Catalogue and other astrometric data. In the event of a spectroscopic binary, the combined spectral type and absolute magnitude are listed in italics.

The list is ordered by increasing distance.

Stars within 10 parsecs
These stars are estimated to be within 32.6 light years of the Sun.

Stars between 10 and 13 parsecs
These stars are estimated to be from 32.7 to 42.4 light years distant from the Sun.

Stars between 13 and 15 parsecs
These stars are estimated to be from 42.5 to 48.9 light years distant from the Sun. A value of 48.9 light years corresponds to a minimum parallax of 66.7 mas.

See also
 Lists of astronomical objects
 Interstellar travel
 Lists of stars
 List of nearest stars and brown dwarfs
 List of star systems within 16–20 light-years
 List of star systems within 20–25 light-years
 List of star systems within 25–30 light-years
 Nearby Stars Database
 SETI (Search for Extra-Terrestrial Intelligence)
 Stellar parallax

References

 Note: see VizieR catalogue V/130.
 Note: this is a "volume-limited" sample of stars within 16 parsecs of the Sun.
 Note: see VizieR catalogue J/A+A/367/521.

 Note: see VizieR catalogue J/ApJS/168/297.
 Note: see VizieR catalogie J/ApJS/159/141.
 Note: see VizieR catalogue I/311.

External links
 
 
 
 
 

nearest bright stars
nearest bright stars
nearest bright stars